Titilagarh Junction railway station (station code:- TIG) is a major railway junction located in the Indian state of Odisha, and serves Titilagarh in Balangir district.
People from nearby villages (such as Sindhekela, Kholan, Naren, Parasara, Chandotara, Turla, Ghodar, Udepur & others) are mostly dependent on Titilagarh railway station for their travel.

History
The  Vizianagaram–Parvatipuram line was opened in 1908–09. The Parvatipuram–Raipur line was completed in 1931. In 1960, Indian Railway took up three projects: the Kottavalasa–Koraput–Jeypore–Kirandaul line (Dandakaranya Project), the Titilagarh–Bolangir–Jharsuguda Project and the Rourkela–Kiriburu Project. All the three projects taken together were popularly known as the DBK Project or the Dandakaranya Bolangir Kiriburu Project.

The  Sambalpur - Titilagarh  Railway  line  forms  a  part  at  the  Project  to  develop  capacity  for  the  export  of  two  million  tons of ore    annually  through  the  Vragapattam Port.  The  Project is  the  result at  a tripartite  agreement  between  the US,  Japan  and  our  country.  The Government of U.S.A. have agreed to

According to the present estimates  of the railway line which is going to be 114 tows in length sanctioned on 24 April 1959  would  cost  Rs.  14.58 crores.  That  would  be the construct­tion part of it We would require some more money for import of diesel locomotives  and  all  that  For  that  we hope  the  United States  loan  will  be available.  The Sambalpur–Titilagarh line was opened to traffic in 1963.
crores.  That  would  be the construc­tion part of it We would require some more money for import of diesel locomotives  and  all  that  For  that  we hope  the  United  States  loan  will  be available.  The Sambalpur–Titilagarh line was opened to traffic in 1963.

Railway reorganisation
The Bengal Nagpur Railway was nationalised in 1944.Eastern Railway was formed on 14 April 1952 with the portion of East Indian Railway Company east of Mughalsarai and the Bengal Nagpur Railway. In 1955, South Eastern Railway was carved out of Eastern Railway. It comprised lines mostly operated by BNR earlier. Amongst the new zones started in April 2003 were East Coast Railway  and South East Central Railway. Both these railways were carved out of South Eastern Railway.

Electrification
Electrification of the Titilagarh–Sambalpur–Jharsuguda was completed in 2018. Till December 2019 Titilagarh Junction is connected with Raipur, Visakhapatnam, Sambalpur via electrified line and the Titilagarh–Sambalpur double line is on construction. Double-line working started in BLSN–MSMD and MSMD–ARN section of this line. As reported on daily newspaper Titilagarh–Rayagada full electrification and doubling work is completed until date.

Amenities
Titilagarh railway station has a six-bedded dormitory. Other amenities at the railway station include computerised reservation offices, telephone booth, cloak room, waiting room, vegetarian refreshment room and book stall.
Parking area for Bikes & Car is available here.

Passenger movement
Titilagarh railway station serves around 84,000 passengers daily.

References

Railway stations in Balangir district
Railway junction stations in Odisha
Sambalpur railway division
Railway stations opened in 1931